The Wanderer is a weekly newspaper that serves the "Tri-town area "of Marion, Massachusetts, Mattapoisett, Massachusetts, and Rochester, Massachusetts in southeastern Massachusetts. The Wanderer is published by Wanderer Com Inc., at 55 County Road in Mattapoisett.

History
The Wanderer was first published in 1992 It  was named after Wanderer (1879), the last whaling ship built in Mattapoisett.

References

External links
 Official site

Newspapers published in Massachusetts
Publications established in 1992
1992 establishments in Massachusetts
Weekly newspapers published in the United States